Maurice Eugène Boisdon (22 March 1855 – 24 October 1928) was a French fencer. He competed in the individual sabre and épée events at the 1900 Summer Olympics.

References

External links
 

1855 births
1928 deaths
French male épée fencers
French male sabre fencers
Olympic fencers of France
Fencers at the 1900 Summer Olympics
Sportspeople from La Rochelle